The Instituto Nacional de Radio y Televisión (Inravisión) was Colombia's national public broadcasting organization between 1964 and 2004. It was created by Decree 3267 of 20 December 1963, which declared that from 1 April 1964 the country's public radio and television broadcasting service would be provided by Inravisión, "a public company with financial, administrative, and legal autonomy".

Among Inravisión's functions were to organize contracts with the programadoras, the companies who produced programs and aired them on the national networks; develop and execute the plans and projects adopted by the Colombian Ministry of Communications; and offer official educational, cultural and informational services through the country's radio and television infrastructure. In 1993, it also assumed the duties of screening programs, which programadoras were required to send 72 hours in advance, for purposes of determining if the programs were suitable for viewing by minors.

In the 1990s, Inravisión was wracked by continual technical problems, which included a 30-minute nationwide outage of all three channels in June 1995, described at the time as "the biggest rough patch in Inravisión's 41-year history"; commercials that didn't air in correct color; signal reception deficiencies, even in major cities such as Cali; poorly calibrated cameras; leaks in the studio buildings; commercials airing for the incorrect newscast; and a 77-minute outage of all three channels in December 1995.

Inravisión was liquidated at the end of 2004, during the first administration (2002–2006) of President Álvaro Uribe Vélez. Contributing factors to the decision included the company's growing pension liabilities (600 billion Colombian pesos), its out-of-date technology, and the programadoras crisis, which left Canal Uno in a failed financial state and forced the state to operate Canal A as Canal Institucional. At its closure, Inravisión had 411 employees. Audiovisuales, the state programadora, was also liquidated.

It was succeeded by Radio Televisión Nacional de Colombia (RTVC).

Slogans
1991-1993 La imagen de la televisión en Colombia (the image of TV in Colombia)
1994 - 40 años haciendo el camino para los colombianos (40 years paving the way for Colombians)
1995-2001 Inravision al %100 es mas! (Inravision at 100% is more!)
2001-2004 siempre al aire (always on air)
2004 - 50 años de televisión en Colombia (50 years of television in Colombia)

References

External links
 Inravisión, Web Archive

Television in Colombia
Communications in Colombia
Publicly funded broadcasters
Television channels and stations established in 1964
Television channels and stations disestablished in 2004
1964 establishments in Colombia
2004 disestablishments in Colombia
State media